Benson Stanley Farb (born October 25, 1967) is an American mathematician at the University of Chicago. His research fields include geometric group theory and low-dimensional topology.

Early life
A native of Norristown, Pennsylvania, Farb earned his bachelor's degree from Cornell University. In 1994, he obtained his doctorate from Princeton University, under supervision of William Thurston.

Career
Farb has advised over 40 students, including Pallavi Dani, Kathryn Mann, Dan Margalit, Karin Melnick and Andrew Putman.

In 2012 Farb became a fellow of the American Mathematical Society. In 2014 he was an invited speaker at the International Congress of Mathematicians in Seoul, speaking in the section on Topology. He was elected to the American Academy of Arts and Sciences in 2021.

Books

Personal life
Farb married Amie Wilkinson, professor of mathematics at the University of Chicago, on December 28, 1996. They are professors in the same department.

References

External links

1967 births
Living people
20th-century American mathematicians
21st-century American mathematicians
Cornell University alumni
Princeton University alumni
University of Chicago faculty
Fellows of the American Mathematical Society
Fellows of the American Academy of Arts and Sciences
Topologists